Sultan Bahu (ਸੁਲਤਾਨ ਬਾਹੂ ; also spelled Bahoo; 17 January 1630 – 1 March 1691), was a 17th-century Punjabi Sufi mystic, poet, scholar and historian. He was active in the Punjab region (present-day Pakistan) during the reigns of Mughal emperors Shah Jahan and Aurangzeb.

Little is known about Bahu's life, other than what is written in a hagiography called Manaqib-i Sultani, which was written by one of Bahu's descendants seven generations after Bahu's own time.

According to these records, he was born in Shorkot, Jhang, in the current Punjab Province of Pakistan, in the Awan tribe. He was son of Bayazid Muhammad, an officer in the Mughal Army, and Rasti. He belonged to Qadiri Sufi order, and started the mystic tradition known as Sarwari Qadiri.

More than forty books on Sufism are attributed to him (mostly written in Persian), largely dealing with specialised aspects of Islam and Islamic mysticism. However, it was his Punjabi poetry which had popular appeal and earned him lasting fame. His verses are sung in many genres of Sufi music, including qawwali and kafi, and tradition has established a unique style of singing his couplets.

Education
Sultan Bahu's first teacher was his mother, Mai Rasti. She pushed him to seek spiritual guidance from Shah Habib Gilani.

Around 1668, Sultan Bahu moved to Delhi for further training under the guidance of Syed Abdul Rehman Jilani Dehlvi, a notable Sufi saint of the Qadiriyya order, and thereafter returned to Punjab where he spent the rest of his life.

Literary works
The exact number of books written by Sultan Bahu is not known, but it is assumed to be at least one hundred. Forty of them are on Sufism and Islamic mysticism. Most of his writings are in the Persian language except Abyat-e-Bahu which is in Punjabi verse.

Only the following books written by Sultan Bahu can be found today:

 Abyat e Bahu 
 Risala e Ruhi
 Sultan ul Waham
 Nur ul Huda
 Aql e Baidar
 Mahq ul Faqr
 Aurang e Shahi
 Jami ul Israr
 Taufiq e Hidiyat
 Kalid Tauheed 
 Ain ul Faqr
 Israr e Qadri
 Kaleed e Jannat
 Muhqam ul Faqr
 Majalis un Nabi
 Muftah ul Arifeen
 Hujjat ul Israr
 Kashf ul Israar
 Mahabat ul Israr
 Ganj ul Israr
 Fazl ul Liqa
 Dewaan e Bahu

Spiritual lineage 
Mian Taj Muhammad was successor of  Sultan Bahu as his spiritual master, however Mian Taj Muhammad was born long after the death of Sultan bahu. Bahu was follower of Abdul Qadir Jilani's Qadiriyya tradition, Sultan Bahu initiated an offshoot of his own which he named Sarwari Qadiri.

According to tradition, the lineage reaches Mian Taj Muhammad as follows:

 Muhammad
 Ali ibn Abi Talib
 Hasan al Basri
 Habib al Ajami
 Dawud Tai
 Maruf Karkhi
 Sirri Saqti
 Junaid Baghdadi
 Abu Bakr Shibli
 Abdul Aziz bin Hars bin Asad Yemeni Tamimi
 Abu Al Fazal Abdul Wahid Yemeni Tamimi
 Mohammad Yousaf Abu al-Farah Tartusi
 Abu-al-Hassan Ali Bin Mohammad Qureshi Hankari
 Abu Saeed Mubarak Makhzoomi
 Abdul Qadir Jilani
 Abdul Razzaq Jilani
 Abdul Jabbar Jilani
 Syed Mohammad Sadiq Yahya
 Najm-ud-Din Burhan Puri
 Abdul Fattah
 Abdul Sattar
 Abdul Baqqa
 Abdul Jaleel
Syed Abdul Rehman Jilani Dehlvi
 Sultan Bahu
 Mian Taj Muhammad 

The Sultan Bahu's tradition is still practised to this day by Mian Taj's successors.

Shrine

The shrine of Sultan Bahu is located in Garh Maharaja, Punjab. It was originally built on Bahu's grave site until the Chenab River changed its course causing the need to relocate twice and as witnessed by those present at the time of relocation, claims that his body was still intact at the time. It is a popular Sufi shrine, and the annual Urs festival commemorating his death is celebrated there with great fervour on the first Thursday of Jumada al-Thani month. People come from far-off places to join the celebrations.

Sultan Bahu also used to hold an annual Urs to commemorate the martyrs of Karbala from the 1st to the 10th day of the month of Muharram. This tradition continues to this day and every year, thousands of pilgrims visit the shrine during the first ten days of Muharram.

See also

List of famous Sufis
Sufism in Pakistan

References

Indian Sufi saints
Sufi poets
1630 births
1691 deaths
Alvis
Persian-language poets
Punjabi-language poets
Punjabi people
Punjabi Sufi saints
17th-century Indian poets
17th-century Islamic religious leaders
17th-century Muslim scholars of Islam
Sufi shrines in Pakistan
Mystic poets
Hashemite people
Alids
Awan